The 2014 Quaker State 400 presented by Advance Auto Parts was a NASCAR Sprint Cup Series stock car race held on June 28, 2014, at Kentucky Speedway in Sparta, Kentucky. Contested over 267 laps on the  tri-oval, it was the 17th race of the 2014 NASCAR Sprint Cup Series. Brad Keselowski led 199 laps during the race, to take his second win of the season. Kyle Busch finished second, while Ryan Newman, Matt Kenseth, and Dale Earnhardt Jr. rounded out the top five. The top rookies of the race were Austin Dillon (16th), Michael Annett (18th), and Justin Allgaier (24th).

Previous week's race
Carl Edwards held off a last lap charge from Jeff Gordon to win the Toyota/Save Mart 350 at Sonoma Raceway. "Real tough. That last lap was ugly. I grew up watching Jeff Gordon do well here so to have him in my mirror is special," Edwards said. "This team has been working very hard. The whole group has. It's very special to be a part of something like this."

Report

Background

Kentucky Speedway is a  tri-oval speedway in Sparta, Kentucky, which has hosted ARCA, NASCAR and Indy Racing League racing annually since it opened in 2000. The track is currently owned and operated by Speedway Motorsports, Inc. and Jerry Carroll, who, along with four other investors, owned Kentucky Speedway until 2008. The speedway has a grandstand capacity of 117,000. Construction of the speedway began in 1998 and was completed in mid-2000. The speedway has hosted the Camping World Truck Series, Nationwide Series, IndyCar Series, Indy Lights, and most recently, the Sprint Cup Series beginning in 2011.

Entry list
The entry list for the Quaker State 400 was released on Monday, June 23, 2014, at 9:09 a.m. Eastern time. Only 42 cars entered the race which made this the first Sprint Cup Series race without a full field of 43 drivers, since the 2001 New Hampshire 300 at New Hampshire Motor Speedway. NASCAR's senior director of communications Kerry Tharp denied that there was any "magic" to a 43-car grid, and also noted how well the sport had been progressing with an improvement in competition. Hendrick Motorsports drivers Jimmie Johnson and Jeff Gordon backed up Tharp's words, with both drivers unconcerned about the lack of a full grid. While the field expanded to 43 on June 27 after BK Racing entered Mike Bliss in the No. 93, J. J. Yeley and Xxxtreme Motorsport withdrew later in the day, citing "internal politics".

Practice

First practice

Final practice

Qualifying
Keselowski was surprised by the performance, having stated that he "thought we were all gonna be a lot slower", and that he would "want to go out there" and achieve the victory. Teammate Joey Logano joined Keselowski on the front row in a Team Penske lockout, in his 200th Cup start. Logano was disappointed to miss out on pole, bemoaning the new-for-2014 qualifying structure.

Qualifying results

Race

First half

Start

Prior to the start of the race, there was a downpour that soaked the track. This prompted NASCAR to schedule a competition caution at lap 30. The race was scheduled to start at 7:45 p.m. Eastern time but started three minutes earlier with Brad Keselowski leading the field to the green flag. Jeff Gordon slipped on the start and fell to eighth. Just ahead of the scheduled competition caution, Denny Hamlin hit the wall in turn three after a tire blowout, and caused the first caution of the race. Hamlin described his impact as "definitely a lot easier than some of the hits I've taken in the past", but was uninjured in the incident. Keselowski led the field to the green on the restart on lap 35, starting a lengthy green-flag run, before the race's second caution on lap 77, caused by Kyle Larson hitting the wall in turn 1. Joey Logano took the lead from teammate Keselowski during the cycle of pit stops.

Team Penske show
Logano led the field to the restart on lap 85, before Keselowski was able to retake the lead two laps later. Another lengthy green-flag run ensued, before debris forced the third caution of the race on lap 126. Prior to the caution, Matt Kenseth suffered a flat right-front tire, and had to pit from sixth position. Logano retook the lead during the pit cycle, while Jeff Gordon suffered a slow pit stop due to a malfunctioning air hose; he lost a total of 16 positions, dropping from 7th to 23rd. Logano and Keselowski swapped the lead positions once again, prior to the fourth caution, on lap 153, for a multi-car wreck on the backstretch involving Aric Almirola, Alex Bowman, Kasey Kahne and Jamie McMurray. Bowman locked up his brakes and tires, causing a large cloud of smoke that made it difficult for trailing cars to see what was in front of them. When the smoke cleared, Almirola swerved to his right to avoid Bowman, but in the process got into the left side of McMurray's car.

Second half

Final laps
The race restarted on lap 161 with Logano leading the field, but Keselowski was back in front a couple of laps later, holding the lead until the fifth caution on lap 176, which was brought out by David Stremme, who spun in turn 4. Logano took the lead on the restart on lap 182, but Keselowski repeated his feat of passing Logano within the first few laps of the restart. Aric Almirola brought out the sixth caution on lap 214 when he hit the wall in turn 1. Kyle Busch took the lead during the cycle; he was the only driver other than the Penske drivers to lead laps during the event, leading 31. Keselowski took the lead from Busch with 20 laps to go and took the checkered flag for the second time in 2014. Keselowski described his car as "awesome" and praised his team for doing a great job". Busch was pleased at his upturn in performance, stating that his car was "a lot better than we've been all year long", but that it had "got so loose there at the end". He was still able to finish in second place, just over a second behind Keselowski.

Race results

Race statistics

Media

Television

Radio

Standings after the race

Drivers' Championship standings

Manufacturers' Championship standings

Note: Only the first sixteen positions are included for the driver standings.

Notes

References

Quaker State 400
Quaker State 400
Quaker State 400
NASCAR races at Kentucky Speedway